Bosi may refer to

Bósa saga ok Herrauðs
Dāna in Korean language
Bank of Scotland Ireland

People
Alfredo Bosi (1936–2021), Brazilian writer
Claude Bosi (born 1972), French chef
Ilio Bosi (1903–1995), Italian politician
Maria Bosi (born 1954), Romanian handball player
Silvana Bosi (1934–2020), Italian actress
Stefano Bosi (born 1954), Italian table tennis player

See also
Lauro De Bosis (1901–1931), Italian poet, aviator and anti-fascist